The 1998–99 Latvian Hockey League season was the eighth season of the Latvian Hockey League, the top level of ice hockey in Latvia. Seven teams participated in the league, and HK Nik's Brih Riga won the championship.

First round

Second round

Final round

Placing round

External links
 Season on hockeyarchives.info

Latvian Hockey League
Latvian Hockey League seasons
Latvian